Baalbek (Syriac-Aramaic: ܒܥܠܒܟ) is a city located east of the Litani River in Lebanon's Beqaa Valley, about  northeast of Beirut. It is the capital of Baalbek-Hermel Governorate. In Greek and Roman times, Baalbek was also known as Heliopolis (Greek for "Sun City"). In 1998, Baalbek had a population of 82,608, mostly Shia Muslims, followed by Sunni Muslims and Lebanese Arab Christians.

It is home to the Baalbek temple complex which includes two of the largest and grandest Roman temple ruins: the Temple of Bacchus and the Temple of Jupiter. It was inscribed in 1984 as an UNESCO World Heritage site.

Name
A few miles from the swamp from which the Litani (the classical Leontes) and the Asi (the upper Orontes) flow, Baalbek may be the same as the manbaa al-nahrayn ("Source of the Two Rivers"), the abode of El in the Ugaritic Baal Cycle discovered in the 1920s and a separate serpent incantation.

Baalbek was called "Heliopolis" during the Roman Empire, a latinisation of the Greek Hēlioúpolis used during the Hellenistic period, meaning "Sun City" in reference to the solar cult there. The name is attested under the Seleucids and Ptolemies. However, Ammianus Marcellinus notes that earlier "Assyrian" names of Levantine towns continued to be used alongside the official Greek ones imposed by the Diadochi, who were successors of Alexander the Great. In Greek religion, Helios was both the sun in the sky and its personification as a god. The local Semitic god Baʿal Haddu was more often equated with Zeus or Jupiter or simply called the "Great God of Heliopolis", but the name may refer to the Egyptians' association of Baʿal with their great god Ra. The importance of the solar cult is also attested in the name Biḳāʿ al-ʿAzīz borne by the plateau surrounding Baalbek, as it references an earlier solar deity and not later men, named Aziz. In Greek and Roman antiquity, it was known as Heliopolis. It still possesses some of the best-preserved Roman ruins in Lebanon, including one of the largest temples of the empire. The gods that were worshipped there (Jupiter, Venus, and Bacchus) were equivalents of the Canaanite deities Hadad, Atargatis. Local influences are seen in the planning and layout of the temples, as they vary from the classic Roman design.

The name  is first attested in the Mishnah, a second-century rabbinic text, as a geographic epithet for a kind of garlic, shum ba'albeki (שום בעלבכי). Two early 5th-century Syriac manuscripts, a  translation of Eusebius's Theophania and a  life of Rabbula, bishop of Edessa. It was pronounced as Baʿlabakk in Classical Arabic. In Modern Standard Arabic, its vowels are marked as Baʿlabak or Baʿlabekk. It is Bʿalbik (is ) in Lebanese Arabic.

The etymology of Baalbek has been debated indecisively since the 18th century. Cook took it to mean "Baʿal (Lord) of the Beka" and Donne as "City of the Sun". Lendering asserts that it is probably a contraction of Baʿal Nebeq ("Lord of the Source" of the Litani River). Steiner proposes a Semitic adaption of "Lord Bacchus", from the classical temple complex.

On the basis of its similar name, several 19th-century Biblical archaeologists attempted to connect Baalbek to the "Baalgad" mentioned in the Hebrew Scripture's Book of Joshua, the Baalath listed among Solomon's cities in the First Book of Kings, the Baal-hamon where he had a vineyard, and the "Plain of Aven" in Amos.

History

Prehistory
The hilltop of Tell Baalbek, part of a valley to the east of the northern Beqaa Valley, shows signs of almost continual habitation over the last 8–9000 years. It was well-watered both from a stream running from the Rās-el-ʿAin spring SE of the citadel and, during the spring, from numerous rills formed by meltwater from the Anti-Lebanons. Macrobius later credited the site's foundation to a colony of Egyptian or Assyrian priests. The settlement's religious, commercial, and strategic importance was minor enough, however, that it is never mentioned in any known Assyrian or Egyptian record, unless under another name. Its enviable position in a fertile valley, major watershed, and along the route from Tyre to Palmyra should have made it a wealthy and splendid site from an early age. During the Canaanite period, the local temples were largely devoted to the Heliopolitan Triad: a male god (Baʿal), his consort (Astarte), and their son (Adon). The site of the present Temple of Jupiter was probably the focus of earlier worship, as its altar was located at the hill's precise summit and the rest of the sanctuary raised to its level.

In Islamic mythology, the temple complex was said to have been a palace of Solomon's which was put together by djinn and given as a wedding gift to the Queen of Sheba; its actual Roman origin remained obscured by the citadel's medieval fortifications as late as the 16th-century visit of the Polish prince Radziwiłł.

Antiquity

After Alexander the Great's conquest of Persia in the 330s BC, Baalbek (under its Hellenic name Heliopolis) formed part of the Diadochi kingdoms of Egypt & Syria. It was annexed by the Romans during their eastern wars. The settlers of the Roman colony Colonia Julia Augusta Felix Heliopolitana may have arrived as early as the time of Caesar but were more probably the veterans of the 5th and 8th Legions under Augustus, during which time it hosted a Roman garrison. From 15 BC to AD 193, it formed part of the territory of Berytus. It is mentioned in Josephus, Pliny, Strabo, and Ptolemy and on coins of nearly every emperor from Nerva to Gallienus. The 1st-century Pliny did not number it among the Decapolis, the "Ten Cities" of Coelesyria, while the 2nd-century Ptolemy did. The population likely varied seasonally with market fairs and the schedules of the Indian monsoon and caravans to the coast and interior.

During Classical Antiquity, the city's temple to Baʿal Haddu was conflated first with the worship of the Greek sun god Helios and then with the Greek and Roman sky god under the name "Heliopolitan Zeus" or "Jupiter". The present Temple of Jupiter presumably replaced an earlier one using the same foundation; it was constructed during the mid-1st century and probably completed around AD 60. His idol was a beardless golden god in the pose of a charioteer, with a whip raised in his right hand and a thunderbolt and stalks of grain in his left; its image appeared on local coinage and it was borne through the streets during several festivals throughout the year. Macrobius compared the rituals to those for Diva Fortuna at Antium and says the bearers were the principal citizens of the town, who prepared for their role with abstinence, chastity, and shaved heads. In bronze statuary attested from Byblos in Phoenicia and Tortosa in Spain, he was encased in a pillarlike term and surrounded (like the Greco-Persian Mithras) by busts representing the sun, moon, and five known planets. In these statues, the bust of Mercury is made particularly prominent; a marble stela at Massilia in Transalpine Gaul shows a similar arrangement but enlarges Mercury into a full figure. Local cults also revered the Baetylia, black conical stones considered sacred to Baʿal. One of these was taken to Rome by the emperor Elagabalus, a former priest "of the sun" at nearby Emesa, who erected a temple for it on the Palatine Hill. Heliopolis was a noted oracle and pilgrimage site, whence the cult spread far afield, with inscriptions to the Heliopolitan god discovered in Athens, Rome, Pannonia, Venetia, Gaul, and near the Wall in Britain. The Roman temple complex grew up from the early part of the reign of Augustus in the late 1st century BC until the rise of Christianity in the 4th century. (The 6th-century chronicles of John Malalas of Antioch, which claimed Baalbek as a "wonder of the world", credited most of the complex to the 2nd-century Antoninus Pius, but it is uncertain how reliable his account is on the point.) By that time, the complex housed three temples on Tell Baalbek: one to Jupiter Heliopolitanus (Baʿal), one to Venus Heliopolitana (Ashtart), and a third to Bacchus. On a nearby hill, a fourth temple was dedicated to the third figure of the Heliopolitan Triad, Mercury (Adon or Seimios). Ultimately, the site vied with Praeneste in Italy as the two largest sanctuaries in the Western world.

The emperor Trajan consulted the site's oracle twice. The first time, he requested a written reply to his sealed and unopened question; he was favorably impressed by the god's blank reply as his own paper had been empty. He then inquired whether he would return alive from his wars against Parthia and received in reply a centurion's vine staff, broken to pieces. In AD 193, Septimius Severus granted the city ius Italicum rights. His wife Julia Domna and son Caracalla toured Egypt and Syria in AD 215; inscriptions in their honour at the site may date from that occasion; Julia was a Syrian native whose father had been an Emesan priest "of the sun" like Elagabalus.

The town became a battleground upon the rise of Christianity. Early Christian writers such as Eusebius (from nearby Caesarea) repeatedly execrated the practices of the local pagans in their worship of the Heliopolitan Venus. In AD 297, the actor Gelasinus converted in the middle of a scene mocking baptism; his public profession of faith provoked the audience to drag him from the theater and stone him to death. In the early 4th century, the deacon Cyril defaced many of the idols in Heliopolis; he was killed and (allegedly) cannibalised. Around the same time, Constantine, though not yet a Christian, demolished the goddess' temple, raised a basilica in its place, and outlawed the locals' ancient custom of prostituting women before marriage. Bar Hebraeus also credited him with ending the locals' continued practice of polygamy. The enraged locals responded by raping and torturing Christian virgins. They reacted violently again under the freedom permitted to them by Julian the Apostate. The city was so noted for its hostility to the Christians that Alexandrians were banished to it as a special punishment. The Temple of Jupiter, already greatly damaged by earthquakes, was demolished under Theodosius in 379 and replaced by another basilica (now lost), using stones scavenged from the pagan complex. The Easter Chronicle states he was also responsible for destroying all the lesser temples and shrines of the city. Around the year 400, Rabbula, the future bishop of Edessa, attempted to have himself martyred by disrupting the pagans of Baalbek but was only thrown down the temple stairs along with his companion. It became the seat of its own bishop as well. Under the reign of Justinian, eight of the complex's Corinthian columns were disassembled and shipped to Constantinople for incorporation in the rebuilt Hagia Sophia sometime between 532 and 537. Michael the Syrian claimed the golden idol of Heliopolitan Jupiter was still to be seen during the reign of Justin II (560s & 570s), and, up to the time of its conquest by the Muslims, it was renowned for its palaces, monuments, and gardens.

Middle Ages

Baalbek was occupied by the Muslim army in AD 634 ( 13), in 636, or under Abu ʿUbaidah following the Byzantine defeat at Yarmouk in 637 ( 16), either peacefully and by agreement or following a heroic defense and yielding  of gold,  of silver, 2000 silk vests, and 1000 swords. The ruined temple complex was fortified under the name  ( "The Fortress") but was sacked with great violence by the Damascene caliph Marwan II in 748, at which time it was dismantled and largely depopulated. It formed part of the district of Damascus under the Umayyads and Abbasids before being conquered by Fatimid Egypt in 942. In the mid-10th century, it was said to have "gates of palaces sculptured in marble and lofty columns also of marble" and that it was the most "stupendous" and "considerable" location in the whole of Syria. It was sacked and razed by the Byzantines under John I in 974, raided by Basil II in 1000, and occupied by Salih ibn Mirdas, emir of Aleppo, in 1025.

In 1075, it was finally lost to the Fatimids on its conquest by Tutush I, Seljuk emir of Damascus. It was briefly held by Muslim ibn Quraysh, emir of Aleppo, in 1083; after its recovery, it was ruled in the Seljuks' name by the eunuch Gümüshtegin until he was deposed for conspiring against the usurper Toghtekin in 1110. Toghtekin then gave the town to his son Buri. Upon Buri's succession to Damascus on his father's death in 1128, he granted the area to his son Muhammad. After Buri's murder, Muhammad successfully defended himself against the attacks of his brothers Ismaʿil and Mahmud and gave Baalbek to his vizier Unur. In July 1139, Zengi, atabeg of Aleppo and stepfather of Mahmud, besieged Baalbek with 14 catapults. The outer city held until 10 October and the citadel until the 21st, when Unur surrendered upon a promise of safe passage. In December, Zengi negotiated with Muhammad, offering to trade Baalbek or Homs for Damascus, but Unur convinced the atabeg to refuse. Zengi strengthened its fortifications and bestowed the territory on his lieutenant Ayyub, father of Saladin. Upon Zengi's assassination in 1146, Ayyub surrendered the territory to Unur, who was acting as regent for Muhammad's son Abaq. It was granted to the eunuch Ata al-Khadim, who also served as viceroy of Damascus.

In December 1151, it was raided by the garrison of Banyas as a reprisal for its role in a Turcoman raid on Banyas. Following Ata's murder, his nephew Dahhak, emir of the Wadi al-Taym, ruled Baalbek. He was forced to relinquish it to Nur ad-Din in 1154 after Ayyub had successfully intrigued against Abaq from his estates near Baalbek. Ayyub then administered the area from Damascus on Nur ad-Din's behalf. In the mid-12th century, Idrisi mentioned Baalbek's two temples and the legend of their origin under Solomon; it was visited by the Jewish traveler Benjamin of Tudela in 1170.

Baalbek's citadel served as a jail for Crusaders taken by the Zengids as prisoners of war. In 1171, these captives successfully overpowered their guards and took possession of the castle from its garrison. Muslims from the surrounding area gathered, however, and entered the castle through a secret passageway shown to them by a local. The Crusaders were then massacred.

Three major earthquakes occurred in the 12th century, in 1139, 1157, and 1170. The one in 1170 ruined Baalbek's walls and, though Nur ad-Din repaired them, his young heir Ismaʿil was made to yield it to Saladin by a 4-month siege in 1174. Having taken control of Damascus on the invitation of its governor Ibn al-Muqaddam, Saladin rewarded him with the  following the Ayyubid victory at the Horns of Hama in 1175. Baldwin, the young leper king of Jerusalem, came of age the next year, ending the Crusaders' treaty with Saladin. His former regent, Raymond of Tripoli, raided the Beqaa Valley from the west in the summer, suffering a slight defeat at Ibn al-Muqaddam's hands. He was then joined by the main army, riding north under Baldwin and Humphrey of Toron; they defeated Saladin's elder brother Turan Shah in August at Ayn al-Jarr and plundered Baalbek. Upon the deposition of Turan Shah for neglecting his duties in Damascus, however, he demanded his childhood home of Baalbek as compensation. Ibn al-Muqaddam did not consent and Saladin opted to invest the city in late 1178 to maintain peace within his own family. An attempt to pledge fealty to the Christians at Jerusalem was ignored on behalf of an existing treaty with Saladin. The siege was maintained peacefully through the snows of winter, with Saladin waiting for the "foolish" commander and his garrison of "ignorant scum" to come to terms. Sometime in spring, Ibn al-Muqaddam yielded and Saladin accepted his terms, granting him Baʿrin, Kafr Tab, and al-Maʿarra. The generosity quieted unrest among Saladin's vassals through the rest of his reign but led his enemies to attempt to take advantage of his presumed weakness. He did not permit Turan Shah to retain Baalbek very long, though, instructing him to lead the Egyptian troops returning home in 1179 and appointing him to a sinecure in Alexandria. Baalbek was then granted to his nephew Farrukh Shah, whose family ruled it for the next half-century. When Farrukh Shah died three years later, his son Bahram Shah was only a child but he was permitted his inheritance and ruled til 1230. He was followed by al-Ashraf Musa, who was succeeded by his brother as-Salih Ismail, who received it in 1237 as compensation for being deprived of Damascus by their brother al-Kamil. It was seized in 1246 after a year of assaults by as-Salih Ayyub, who bestowed it upon Saʿd al-Din al-Humaidi. When as-Salih Ayyub's successor Turan Shah was murdered in 1250, al-Nasir Yusuf, the sultan of Aleppo, seized Damascus and demanded Baalbek's surrender. Instead, its emir did homage and agreed to regular payments of tribute.

The Mongolian general Kitbuqa took Baalbek in 1260 and dismantled its fortifications. Later in the same year, however, Qutuz, the sultan of Egypt, defeated the Mongols and placed Baalbek under the rule of their emir in Damascus. Most of the city's still-extant fine mosque and fortress architecture dates to the reign of the sultan Qalawun in the 1280s. By the early 14th century, Abulfeda the Hamathite was describing the city's "large and strong fortress". In 1400, Timur pillaged the town, and there was further destruction from a 1459 earthquake.

Early modernity
In 1516, Baalbek was conquered with the rest of Syria by the Ottoman sultan Selim the Grim. In recognition of their prominence among the Shiites of the Beqaa Valley, the Ottomans awarded the sanjak of Homs and local iltizam concessions to Baalbek's Harfush family. Like the Hamadas, the Harfush emirs were involved on more than one occasion in the selection of Church officials and the running of local monasteries. Tradition holds that many Christians quit the Baalbek region in the eighteenth century for the newer, more secure town of Zahlé on account of the Harfushes' oppression and rapacity, but more critical studies have questioned this interpretation, pointing out that the Harfushes were closely allied to the Orthodox Ma'luf family of Zahlé (where indeed Mustafa Harfush took refuge some years later) and showing that depredations from various quarters as well as Zahlé's growing commercial attractiveness accounted for Baalbek's decline in the eighteenth century. What repression there was did not always target the Christian community per se. The Shiite 'Usayran family, for example, is also said to have left Baalbek in this period to avoid expropriation by the Harfushes, establishing itself as one of the premier commercial households of Sidon and later even serving as consuls of Iran.

From the 16th century, European tourists began to visit the colossal and picturesque ruins. Donne hyperbolised "No ruins of antiquity have attracted more attention than those of Heliopolis, or been more frequently or accurately measured and described." Misunderstanding the temple of Bacchus as the "Temple of the Sun", they considered it the best-preserved Roman temple in the world. The Englishman Robert Wood's 1757 Ruins of Balbec included carefully measured engravings that proved influential on British and Continental Neoclassical architects. For example, details of the Temple of Bacchus's ceiling inspired a bed and ceiling by Robert Adam and its portico inspired that of St George's in Bloomsbury.

During the 18th century, the western approaches were covered with attractive groves of walnut trees, but the town itself suffered badly during the 1759 earthquakes, after which it was held by the Metawali, who again feuded with other Lebanese tribes. Their power was broken by Jezzar Pasha, the rebel governor of Acre, in the last half of the 18th century. All the same, Baalbek remained no destination for a traveller unaccompanied by an armed guard. Upon the pasha's death in 1804, chaos ensued until Ibrahim Pasha of Egypt occupied the area in 1831, after which it again passed into the hands of the Harfushes. In 1835, the town's population was barely 200 people. In 1850, the Ottomans finally began direct administration of the area, making Baalbek a kaza under the Damascus Eyalet and its governor a kaymakam.

Excavations

Emperor Wilhelm II of Germany and his wife passed through Baalbek on 1 November 1898, on their way to Jerusalem. He noted both the magnificence of the Roman remains and the drab condition of the modern settlement. It was expected at the time that natural disasters, winter frosts, and the raiding of building materials by the city's residents would shortly ruin the remaining ruins. The archaeological team he dispatched began work within a month. Despite finding nothing they could date prior to Baalbek's Roman occupation, Otto Puchstein and his associates worked until 1904 and produced a meticulously researched and thoroughly illustrated series of volumes. Later excavations under the Roman flagstones in the Great Court unearthed three skeletons and a fragment of Persian pottery dated to the 6th–4th centuries BC. The sherd featured cuneiform letters.

In 1977, Jean-Pierre Adam made a brief study suggesting most of the large blocks could have been moved on rollers with machines using capstans and pulley blocks, a process which he theorised could use 512 workers to move a  block. "Baalbek, with its colossal structures, is one of the finest examples of Imperial Roman architecture at its apogee", UNESCO reported in making Baalbek a World Heritage Site in 1984. When the committee inscribed the site, it expressed the wish that the protected area include the entire town within the Arab walls, as well as the southwestern extramural quarter between Bastan-al-Khan, the Roman site and the Mameluk mosque of Ras-al-Ain. Lebanon's representative gave assurances that the committee's wish would be honoured. Recent cleaning operations at the Temple of Jupiter discovered the deep trench at its edge, whose study pushed back the date of Tell Baalbek's settlement to the PPNB Neolithic. Finds included pottery sherds including a spout dating to the early Bronze Age. In the summer of 2014, a team from the German Archaeological Institute led by Jeanine Abdul Massih of the Lebanese University discovered a sixth, much larger stone suggested to be the world's largest ancient block. It is estimated to weigh .

20th century

Baalbek was connected to the DHP, the French-owned railway concession in Ottoman Syria, on 19 June 1902. It formed a station on the standard-gauge line between Riyaq to its south and Aleppo (now in Syria) to its north. This Aleppo Railway connected to the Beirut–Damascus Railway but—because that line was built to a 1.05-meter gauge—all traffic had to be unloaded and reloaded at Riyaq. Just before the First World War, the population was still around 5000, about 2000 each of Sunnis and Shia Mutawalis and 1000 Orthodox and Maronites. The French general Georges Catroux proclaimed the independence of Lebanon in 1941 but colonial rule continued until 1943. Baalbek still has its railway station but service has been discontinued since the 1970s, originally owing to the Lebanese Civil War.

The Roman ruins have been the setting for the long running Baalbek International Festival.

In March 1974, Musa al-Sadr announced the launching of the "Movement of the Deprived" in front of a large rally in Baalbek. Its objective was to stand up for Lebanon's neglected Shia community. He also announced the setting up of military training camps to train villagers in southern Lebanon to protect their homes from Israeli attacks. These camps led to the creation of the Amal Militia. In 1982, at the height of the Israeli invasion, Amal split into two factions over Nabih Berri's acceptance of the American plan to evacuate Palestinians from West Beirut. A large number of dissidents, led by Amal's military commander Hussein Musawi moved to Baalbek. Once established in the town the group, which was to evolve into Hizbollah, began to work with Iranian Revolutionary Guards, veterans of the Iran Iraq War. The following year the Iranians established their headquarters in the Sheikh Abdullah barracks in Baalbek. Ultimately there were between 1,500 and 2,000 Revolutionary Guards in Lebanon, with outposts further south in the Shia villages, such as Jebchit.

On 24/25 June 1999, following elections in Israel and the new administration undecided, the IAF launched two massive air raids across Lebanon. One of the targets was the al Manar radio station’s offices in a four storey building in Baalbek which was completely demolished. The attacks also hit Beirut’s power stations and bridges on the roads to the south. An estimated $52 million damage was caused. Eleven Lebanese were killed as well as two Israelis in Kiryat Shmona.

2006 Lebanon War

On the evening of 1 August 2006, hundreds of Israeli Defense Forces (IDF) soldiers raided Baalbek and the Dar al-Hikma or Hikmeh Hospital in Jamaliyeh to its north ("Operation Sharp and Smooth"). Their mission was to rescue two captured soldiers, Ehud Goldwasser and Eldad Regev, who were abducted by Hezbollah on 12 July 2006. They were transported by helicopter and supported by Apache helicopters and unmanned drones, The IDF was acting on information that Goldwasser and Regev were at the hospital. al-Jazeera and other sources claimed the IDF was attempting to capture senior Hezbollah officials, particularly Sheikh Mohammad Yazbek. The hospital had been empty for four days, the most unwell patients having been transferred and the rest sent home. No Israelis were killed; Five civilians were abducted and interrogated by the Israelis, presumably because one shared his name with Hassan Nasrallah, the secretary general of Hezbollah; they were released on August 21. Another 9 civilians were killed on 7 August by a strike in the middle of Brital, just south of Baalbek, and by the subsequent attack on the car leaving the scene for the hospital. On 14 August just before the ceasefire took effect, two Lebanese police and five Lebanese soldiers were killed by a drone strike while driving their van around the still-damaged road through Jamaliyeh.

Conservation work at Lebanon's historic sites began in October. The ruins at Baalbek were not directly hit but the effects of blasts during the conflict toppled a block of stones at the Roman ruins and existing cracks in the temples of Jupiter and Bacchus were feared to have widened. Frederique Husseini, director-general of Lebanon's Department of Antiquities, requested $550,000 from Europeans to restore Baalbek's souk and another $900,000 for repairs to other damaged structures.

Ruins 

The Tell Baalbek temple complex, fortified as the town's citadel during the Middle Ages, was constructed from local stone, mostly white granite and a rough white marble. Over the years, it has suffered from the region's numerous earthquakes, the iconoclasm of Christian and Muslim lords, and the reuse of the temples' stone for fortification and other construction. The nearby Qubbat Duris, a 13th-century Muslim shrine on the old road to Damascus, is built out of granite columns, apparently removed from Baalbek. Further, the jointed columns were once banded together with iron; many were gouged open or toppled by the emirs of Damascus to get at the metal. As late as the 16th century, the Temple of Jupiter still held 27 standing columns out of an original 58; there were only nine before the 1759 earthquakes and six today.

The complex is located on an immense raised plaza erected  over an earlier T-shaped base consisting of a podium, staircase, and foundation walls. These walls were built from about 24 monoliths, at their lowest level weighing approximately  each. They weigh approximately  each. A fourth, still larger stone is called the Stone of the Pregnant Woman: it lies unused in a nearby quarry  from the town. A fifth, still larger stone weighing approximately  lies in the same quarry. This quarry was slightly higher than the temple complex, so no lifting was required to move the stones. Through the foundation there run three enormous passages the size of railway tunnels.

The temple complex was entered from the east through the Propylaea (propýlaion) or Portico, consisting of a broad staircase rising  to an arcade of 12 columns flanked by 2 towers. Most of the columns have been toppled and the stairs were entirely dismantled for use in the nearby later wall, but a Latin inscription remains on several of their bases stating that Longinus, a lifeguard of the 1st Parthian Legion, and Septimius, a freedman, gilded their capitals with bronze in gratitude for the safety of Septimius Severus's son Antoninus Caracalla and empress Julia Domna.

Immediately behind the Propylaeum is a hexagonal forecourt reached through a threefold entrance that was added in the mid-3rd century by the emperor Philip the Arab. Traces remain of the two series of columns which once encircled it, but its original function remains uncertain. Donne reckoned it as the town's forum. Badly preserved coins of the era led some to believe this was a sacred cypress grove, but better specimens show that the coins displayed a single stalk of grain instead.

These were surrounded by Corinthian porticoes, one of which was never completed. Six remain standing, out of an original 128. Inscriptions attest that the court was once adorned by portraits of Marcus Aurelius's daughter Sabina, Septimius Severus, Gordian, and Velius Rufus, dedicated by the city's Roman colonists. The entablature was richly decorated but is now mostly ruined. A westward-facing basilica was constructed over the altar during the reign of Theodosius; it was later altered to make it eastward-facing like most Christian churches.

The Temple of Jupiter—once wrongly credited to Helios—lay at the western end of the Great Court, raised another  on a  platform reached by a wide staircase. Under the Byzantines, it was also known as the "Trilithon" from the three massive stones in its foundation and, when taken together with the forecourt and Great Court, it is also known as the Great Temple. The Temple of Jupiter proper was circled by a peristyle of 54 unfluted Corinthian columns: 10 in front and back and 19 along each side. The temple was ruined by earthquakes, destroyed and pillaged for stone under Theodosius, and 8 columns were taken to Constantinople (Istanbul) under Justinian for incorporation into the Hagia Sophia. Three fell during the late 18th century. 6 columns, however, remain standing along its south side with their entablature. Their capitals remain nearly perfect on the south side, while the Beqaa's winter winds have worn the northern faces almost bare. Individual Roman cranes were not capable of lifting stones this heavy. They may have simply been rolled into position along temporary earthen banks from the quarry or multiple cranes may have been used in combination. They may also have alternated sides a little at a time, filling in supports underneath each time. The Julio-Claudian emperors enriched its sanctuary in turn. In the mid-1st century, Nero built the tower-altar opposite the temple. In the early 2nd century, Trajan added the temple's forecourt, with porticos of pink granite shipped from Aswan at the southern end of Egypt.

The Temple of Bacchus—once wrongly credited to Jupiter—may have been completed under Septimius Severus in the 190s, as his coins are the first to show it beside the Temple of Jupiter. It is the best preserved of the sanctuary's structures, as the other rubble from its ruins protected it. It is enriched by some of the most refined reliefs and sculpture to survive from antiquity. These were probably erected in a rough state and then rounded, polished, and decorated in position. The entrance was preserved as late as Pococke and Wood, but the keystone of the lintel had slid  following the 1759 earthquakes; a column of rough masonry was erected in the 1860s or '70s to support it. The 1759 earthquakes also damaged the area around the soffit's famed inscription of an eagle, which was entirely covered by the keystone's supporting column. The area around the inscription of the eagle was greatly damaged by the 1759 earthquake. The screen between the two sections once held reliefs of Neptune, Triton, Arion and his dolphin, and other marine figures but these have been lost. The temple was used as a kind of donjon for the medieval Arab and Turkish fortifications, although its eastern steps were lost sometime after 1688. Much of the portico was incorporated into a huge wall directly before its gate, but this was demolished in July 1870 by Barker on orders from Syria's governor Rashid Pasha. Two spiral staircases in columns on either side of the entrance lead to the roof.

The Temple of Venus—also known as the Circular Temple or Nymphaeum—was added under Septimius Severus in the early 3rd century but destroyed under Constantine, who raised a basilica in its place. Jessup considered it the "gem of Baalbek". It was known in the 19th century as El Barbara or Barbarat el-Atikah (St Barbara's), having been used as a Greek Orthodox church into the 18th century.

Much of the extant fortifications around the complex date to the 13th century reconstruction undertaken by the Mamluk sultan Qalawun following the devastation of the earlier defenses by the Mongol army under Kitbuqa. This includes the great southeast tower. The earliest round of fortifications were two walls to the southwest of the Temples of Jupiter and Bacchus. The original southern gateway with two small towers was filled in and replaced by a new large tower flanked by curtains, probably under Buri or Zengi. Bahramshah replaced that era's southwest tower with one of his own in 1213 and built another in the northwest in 1224; the west tower was probably strengthened around the same time. An inscription dates the barbican-like strengthening of the southern entrance to around 1240. Qalawun relocated the two western curtains nearer to the western tower, which was rebuilt with great blocks of stone. The barbican was repaired and more turns added to its approach. From around 1300, no alterations were made to the fortifications apart from repairs such as Sultan Barkuk's restoration of the moat in preparation for Timur's arrival.

Material from the ruins is incorporated into a ruined mosque north of downtown and probably also in the Qubbat Duris on the road to Damascus. In the 19th century, a "shell-topped canopy" from the ruins was used nearby as a mihrab, propped up to show locals the direction of Mecca for their daily prayers.

Tomb of Husayn's daughter
Under a white dome further towards town is the tomb of Khawla, daughter of Hussein and granddaughter of Ali, who died in Baalbek while Husayn's family was being transported as prisoners to Damascus.

Ecclesiastical history 
Heliopolis (in Phoenicia; not to be confused with the Egyptian bishopric Heliopolis in Augustamnica) was a bishopric under Roman and Byzantine rule, but it disappeared due to the Islamic rule.

In 1701, Eastern Catholics (Byzantine Rite) established anew an Eparchy of Baalbek, which in 1964 was promoted to the present Melkite Greek Catholic Archeparchy of Baalbek.

Titular see 
In the Latin rite, the Ancient diocese was only nominally restored (no later than 1876) as Titular archbishopric of Heliopolis (Latin) / Eliopoli (Curiate Italian), demoted in 1925 to Episcopal Titular bishopric, promoted back in 1932, with its name changed (avoiding Egyptian confusion) in 1933 to (non-Metropolitan) Titular archbishopric of Heliopolis in Phoenicia.

The title has not been assigned since 1965. It was held by:
 Titular Archbishop: Luigi Poggi (1876.09.29 – death 1877.01.22) on emeritate (promoted) as former Bishop of Rimini (Italy) (1871.10.27 – 1876.09.29)
 Titular Archbishop: Mario Mocenni (1877.07.24 – 1893.01.16) as papal diplomat : Apostolic Delegate to Colombia (1877.08.14 – 1882.03.28), Apostolic Delegate to Costa Rica, Nicaragua and Honduras (1877.08.14 – 1882.03.28), Apostolic Delegate to Ecuador (1877.08.14 – 1882.03.28), Apostolic Delegate to Peru and Bolivia (1877.08.14 – 1882.03.28), Apostolic Delegate to Venezuela (1877.08.14 – 1882.03.28), Apostolic Internuncio to Brazil (1882.03.28 – 1882.10.18), created Cardinal-Priest of S. Bartolomeo all'Isola (1893.01.19 – 1894.05.18), promoted Cardinal-Bishop of Sabina (1894.05.18 – death 1904.11.14)
 Titular Archbishop: Augustinus Accoramboni (1896.06.22 – death 1899.05.17), without prelature
 Titular Archbishop: Robert John Seton (1903.06.22 – 1927.03.22), without prelature
Titular Bishop: Gerald O'Hara (1929.04.26 – 1935.11.26) as Auxiliary Bishop of Philadelphia (Pennsylvania, USA) (1929.04.26 – 1935.11.26), later Bishop of Savannah (USA) (1935.11.26 – 1937.01.05), restyled (only) Bishop of Savannah–Atlanta (USA) (1937.01.05 – 1950.07.12), promoted Archbishop-Bishop of Savannah (1950.07.12 – 1959.11.12), also Apostolic Nuncio (papal ambassador) to Ireland (1951.11.27 – 1954.06.08), Apostolic Delegate to Great Britain (1954.06.08 – death 1963.07.16) and Titular Archbishop of Pessinus (1959.11.12 – 1963.07.16)
 Titular Archbishop: Alcide Marina, C.M. (1936.03.07 – death 1950.09.18), mainly as papal diplomat : Apostolic Delegate to Iran (1936.03.07 – 1945), Apostolic Administrator of Roman Catholic Apostolic Vicariate of Constantinople (Turkey) (1945–1947) and Apostolic Delegate to Turkey (1945–1947), Apostolic Nuncio to Lebanon (1947 – 1950.09.18)
 Titular Archbishop: Daniel Rivero Rivero (1951 – death 1960.05.23) (born Bolivia) on emeritate, formerly Titular Bishop of Tlous (1922.05.17 – 1931.03.30) as Coadjutor Bishop of Santa Cruz de la Sierra (Bolivia) (1922.05.17 – 1931.03.30) succeeding as Bishop of Santa Cruz de la Sierra (1931.03.30 – 1940.02.03), Metropolitan Archbishop of Sucre (Bolivia) (1940.02.03 – 1951)
 Titular Archbishop: Raffaele Calabria (1960.07.12 – 1962.01.01) as Coadjutor Archbishop of Benevento (Italy) (1960.07.12 – 1962.01.01), succeeding as Metropolitan Archbishop of Benevento (1962.01.01 – 1982.05.24); previously Titular Archbishop of Soteropolis (1950.05.06 – 1952.07.10) as Coadjutor Archbishop of Otranto (Italy) (1950.05.06 – 1952.07.10), succeeding as Metropolitan Archbishop of Otranto (Italy) (1952.07.10 – 1960.07.12)
 Titular Archbishop: Ottavio De Liva (1962.04.18 – death 1965.08.23) as papal diplomat : Apostolic Internuncio to Indonesia (1962.04.18 – 1965.08.23).

Climate 
Baalbek has a mediterranean climate (Köppen climate classification: Csa) with significant continental influences. It is located in one of the drier regions of the country, giving it an average of 450mm of precipitation (compared with 800-850mm in coastal areas) annually, overwhelmingly concentrated in the months from November to April. Baalbek has hot rainless summers with cool (and occasionally snowy) winters. Autumn and spring are mild and fairly rainy.

Notable people 
 Saint Barbara (273–306)
Callinicus of Heliopolis (c. 600 - c. 680), chemist and inventor
 Abd al-Rahman al-Awza'i (707–774)
Qusta ibn Luqa (820–912), mathematician and translator
 Sheikh Adi ibn Musafir (1070s–1162)
 Bahāʾ al-dīn al-ʿĀmilī (1547–1621), Lebanese-Iranian scholar, philosopher, architect, mathematician, astronomer
 Rahme Haider (born 1886), American lecturer from Baalbek
 Khalil Mutran (1872–1949), poet and journalist
 Juliana Awada, former First Lady of Argentina.
 Harfush dynasty

In popular culture 
 Letitia Elizabeth Landon's poetical illustration  is on a painting by William Henry Bartlett entitled Six detached pillars of the Great Temple at Balbec, and was published in Fisher's Drawing Room Scrap Book, 1839.
 Ameen Rihani's The Book of Khalid (1911), the first English novel by an Arab-American, is set in Baalbek.
 The events of the 1984 novel Les fous de Baalbek (SAS, #74) by Gérard de Villiers take place in Baalbek.

Twin towns 
Baalbek is twinned with:
  Bari, Italy
  L'Aquila, Italy
  Thrace, Greece
  Yogyakarta, Indonesia.

Gallery

See also 
 Cities of the ancient Near East
 List of Catholic dioceses in Lebanon
 List of colossal sculpture in situ
 List of megalithic sites

Notes

References

Sources and external links 

 Google Maps satellite view
 Panoramas of the temples at Lebanon 360 and Discover Lebanon
 Archaeological research in Baalbek from the German Archaeological Institute
 GCatholic – Latin titular see
 Baalbeck International Festival
 Baalbek Railway Station (2006) at Al Mashriq
 
 
 
 
 
 
 
 
 
 
 
 
 
 
 
 
 
 
 
 
 
volume I
volume II
 
 
 
 
 
 
 
 
 
 
 
 
 
 
 
 
 
 
 
 
 
 
 
 
 
  & 
 
 
 
 
 
 
 
 
 
 
  Reprinted at Görlitz in 1591.

Further reading 
 
 

Lost ancient cities and towns
Tourist attractions in Lebanon
Populated places in Baalbek District
World Heritage Sites in Lebanon
Archaeological sites in Lebanon
Great Rift Valley
Phoenician cities
Phoenician sites in Lebanon
Coloniae (Roman)
Populated places established in the 7th millennium BC
Roman sites in Lebanon
Tourism in Lebanon
7th-millennium BC establishments
Sunni Muslim communities in Lebanon
Pre-Pottery Neolithic B